Charles Donald Field (February 14, 1899 – June 6, 1952) served in the California State Assembly for the 43rd district from 1933 to 1949. During World War I he served in the United States Army.

He was married to Gladys Field (born 1906) and the two had a son, C. Don Jr. (born 1940), and daughter.

References

External links

United States Army personnel of World War I
Republican Party members of the California State Assembly
1899 births
1952 deaths
People from Aledo, Texas